Lee Seung-hyun (Hangul: 이승현) (born April 19, 2002, in Daegu) is a South Korean pitcher for the Samsung Lions in the Korea Baseball Organization (KBO).

References 

Samsung Lions players
KBO League pitchers
South Korean baseball players
2002 births
Living people
Sportspeople from Daegu